Turbići (Cyrillic: Турбићи) is a village in the municipality of Kakanj, Bosnia and Herzegovina, counting 46 inhabitants as of 2013.

Demographics 
According to the 2013 census, its population was 43.

References

Populated places in Kakanj